The Ambassador of Australia to China is an officer of the Australian Department of Foreign Affairs and Trade and the head of the Embassy of the Commonwealth of Australia to the People's Republic of China (PRC). The position has the rank and status of an Ambassador Extraordinary and Plenipotentiary and has lived in Beijing since 1973. The incumbent ambassador is Graham Fletcher who took up the appointment in July 2019. The ambassador's work is assisted by multiple consulates throughout the country that have visiting and reporting responsibilities, as well as handling consular and trade matters for the embassy.

Posting history
Australia's first diplomatic representative in China was Vivian Gordon Bowden, who in 1935 was appointed as a trade commissioner based in Shanghai. The establishment of trade commissions in several Asian countries was an initiative of the Lyons government first announced in 1933, where previously Australian interests had been represented by the United Kingdom. Bowden's office was based in the HSBC Building within the Shanghai International Settlement. Bowden served until 1941 when he was transferred to Singapore, with the trade commission taken over by the new formal legation in Chungking.

Australia's legation was first accredited to the Republic of China and was located in Chungking (Chongqing) from 1941 to 1946, with the first Minister, Sir Frederic Eggleston, presenting his credentials to President Lin Sen on 30 October 1941. The legation later moved to Nanking (Nanjing) from June 1946 to 1949, initially located at 34 Peiping Road and then 26 Yihe Road. Following the Proclamation of the People's Republic of China in 1949, the Australian Government recalled its Ambassador from China to discuss recognition of the Communist Government. The Government of the Republic of China, having retreated to Taipei, Taiwan, maintained its embassy in Australia until December 1972. In 1966 Australia opened an Embassy in Taipei. In 1972, diplomatic relations ceased following the decision of the government of Prime Minister Gough Whitlam to recognise the People's Republic of China, and the Taipei Embassy closed in 1973. As a result of Australia's recognition of the PRC in 1973, Australia has no diplomatic representation in Taiwan and continues economic, trade and cultural relations through the Australian Office in Taipei.

After diplomatic recognition of the PRC in 1972, Australia established an Embassy in Beijing in 1973, followed by Consulates-General in Shanghai (1984), Guangzhou (1992), and Chengdu (2013). The latter was opened following release of the Asian Century White Paper by the Gillard government, and calls for an expanded diplomatic footprint in China. On 9 November 2014 the Minister for Foreign  Affairs, Julie Bishop, formally opened the Australian Consulate-General in Chengdu. In March 2017, an agreement was signed to establish a fifth Australian Consulate-General in 2018, to be located in the northern city of Shenyang. From 1991 to 2008, the Ambassador to China was also accredited to Mongolia.

List of officeholders

Heads of Mission

Republic of China, 1941–1949

Republic of China (Taiwan), 1966–1973

People's Republic of China, 1973–present

Notes
 Also non-resident Australian Ambassador to Mongolia, 1991 to 2008.

Deputy Heads of Mission

Consuls-General

Chengdu

Guangzhou

Shenyang

See also
List of ambassadors of China to Australia

References

External links

Australian Embassy, China
Australian Consulate-General, Chengdu
Australian Consulate-General, Guangzhou
Australian Consulate-General, Shenyang

 
 
 
China
Australia